Renée Poznanski (born 26 April 1949 in Paris) is a French-born Israeli  historian, specialist in the Holocaust, and the Jewish Resistance in France during the Second World War, who teaches at the Ben-Gurion University of the Negev, in Beersheba, in Israel.

Works
 Renée Poznanski, Denis Peschanski, Drancy en France: de la Cité de la Muette au 'camp des Juifs''', Paris, Fayard, 2015. 
 Renée Poznanski (ed.), Jacques Biélinky, Journal 1940-1942. Un journaliste juif à Paris sous l’Occupation, Paris, Éditions du CNRS and Cerf, sept. 2011, (First edition 1992). 
 Renée Poznanski, Propagandes et persécutions, La Résistance et le 'problème juif', Paris, Fayard, 2008. 
 Renée Poznanski, Les Juifs en France, pendant la Seconde Guerre mondiale'', New pocket edition (in French), January 2005, Pluriel, Hachette-Littératures, Paris (First edition in 1994 ; English edition in 2001 ; Hebrew edition in 1999).

References 

1949 births
Living people
20th-century French Jews
20th-century French historians
Academic staff of Ben-Gurion University of the Negev
People from Paris